Vadinsky District is an administrative and municipal district (raion), one of the twenty-seven in Penza Oblast, Russia. It is located in the northwest of the oblast. Its administrative center is the rural locality (a selo) of Vadinsk. Population: 9,807 (2010 Census);  The population of Vadinsk accounts for 49.9% of the district's total population.

Notable residents 

Ivan Mokrousov (1919–1972), Red Army soldier during World War II, Hero of the Soviet Union, born in the village of Rakhmanivka
Georg Myasnikov (1926–1996), politician and historian

References

Notes

Sources

 
Districts of Penza Oblast